Portsmouth City Council is the local authority of the city of Portsmouth, Hampshire, England. It is a unitary authority, having the powers of a non-metropolitan county and district council combined. It provides a full range of local government services including Council Tax billing, libraries, social services, processing planning applications, waste collection and disposal, and it is a local education authority.

Powers and functions
The local authority derives its powers and functions from the Local Government Act 1972 and subsequent legislation. For the purposes of local government, Portsmouth is within a non-metropolitan area of England. As a unitary authority, Portsmouth City Council has the powers and functions of both a non-metropolitan county and district council combined. In its capacity as a district council it is a billing authority collecting council tax and business rates, it processes local planning applications, and it is responsible for housing, waste collection, and environmental health. In its capacity as a unitary council it is a local education authority, responsible for social services, libraries, and waste disposal.

Political composition
Portsmouth City Council consists of 42 councillors with one third of the council being elected every four years, electing one out of three councillors for each of the city's 14 wards.

Since the first election to the council in 1973 political control of the council has been held by the following parties:

Councillors and wards
List of Portsmouth city councillors by ward:

See also 
 Portsmouth City Council elections

References

Unitary authority councils of England
Local education authorities in England
Local authorities in Hampshire
Leader and cabinet executives
Billing authorities in England
City Council